This list is of the Historic Sites of Japan located within the Prefecture of Yamaguchi.

National Historic Sites
As of 1 July 2019, forty-three Sites have been designated as being of national significance.

Prefectural Historic Sites
As of 1 May 2018, thirty-one Sites have been designated as being of prefectural importance.

Municipal Historic Sites
As of 1 May 2018, a further one hundred and thirty-five Sites have been designated as being of municipal importance.

See also
 Cultural Properties of Japan
 Suō Province
 Nagato Province
 Yamaguchi Prefectural Museum
 List of Cultural Properties of Japan - paintings (Yamaguchi)
 List of Places of Scenic Beauty of Japan (Yamaguchi)

References

External links
   Cultural Propertied in Yamaguchi Prefecture

Yamaguchi Prefecture
 Yamaguchi